Ole H. Olson (September 19, 1872 – January 29, 1954) was the 16th lieutenant governor and 18th governor of North Dakota.

Biography
Olson was born in Mondovi, Wisconsin. He was the oldest child of nine from parents who had emigrated from Sogn, Norway. After graduating from Concordia College, in Moorhead, Minnesota, Olson moved to Eddy County, North Dakota, and established a successful farm. He married Julia Ramberget on December 12, 1912, and they had four sons and six daughters.

Career
Elected to the North Dakota House of Representatives, Olson served from 1917 to 1919. He was then elected to the North Dakota State Senate, serving from 1919 to 1931, and as president pro tempore in 1929. Olson was elected the 16th lieutenant governor of North Dakota. In 1934, Governor William Langer was removed from office and sentenced to prison after a scandal, and Olson was sworn in as the 18th governor. He served the remainder of Langer's term. During his brief tenure, demonstrators marched on the state capitol and the National Guard was called in.

Death
Olson died in New Rockford, North Dakota, on January 29, 1954, at the age of 81. He is buried at Grandfield Lutheran Cemetery in rural Sheyenne, Eddy County, North Dakota.

References

External links
National Governors Association

1872 births
1954 deaths
Republican Party governors of North Dakota
Lieutenant Governors of North Dakota
Presidents pro tempore of the North Dakota Senate
Republican Party North Dakota state senators
Republican Party members of the North Dakota House of Representatives
American Lutherans
American people of Norwegian descent
People from Mondovi, Wisconsin
People from Eddy County, North Dakota
Nonpartisan League state governors of the United States
20th-century American politicians